Jugureni is a commune in Prahova County, Muntenia, Romania. It is composed of five villages: Boboci, Jugureni, Trusctienii, Marginea Pădurii and Valea Unghiului.

References

Communes in Prahova County
Localities in Muntenia